Sky Eats Airplane is the second and final album by American metalcore band Sky Eats Airplane. The album was recorded in early 2008 with producer Brian McTernan and was released on July 22. The album contains 11 tracks, 8 of which are new and 3 of which that are re-recorded versions of previously released demos. The album is the band's first album as a 5 piece and without former vocalist/programmer Brack Cantrell. It is also the first and last album with vocalist Jerry Roush. Prior to the album's release a video for the first single "Numbers" was made and was released on March 27, 2009.

The album debuted at #172 on The Billboard 200 chart with first week sales of 4,000.

Track listing

Personnel
Sky Eats Airplane
Jerry Roush - lead vocals
Zack Ordway – lead guitar, keyboards, programming
Lee Duck – rhythm guitar, keyboards, synthesizers, electronics, programming, backing vocals
Johno Erickson – bass
Kenny Schick – drums, percussion

Additional
 Michah Kinard – additional vocals on track 4
 Brian McTernan – production, engineer, mixing
 Paul Leavitt – digital editing
 Evan Leake – artwork

Charts

References

External links
Sky Eats Airplane at Equal Vision

2008 albums
Equal Vision Records albums
Sky Eats Airplane albums
Albums produced by Brian McTernan